The following television stations broadcast on digital channel 10 in the United States:

 K10AC-D in Ashland, Montana
 K10AD-D in Vallecito, Colorado
 K10AH-D in Emigrant, Montana
 K10AP-D in Pateros/Mansfield, Washington
 K10AW-D in Challis, Idaho
 K10BA-D in Orondo, etc., Washington
 K10BD-D in Winthrop-Twisp, Washington
 K10BK-D in Big Sandy, Montana
 K10BU-D in Lund & Preston, Nevada
 K10CG-D in Aztec, New Mexico
 K10DK-D in Malott/Wakefield, Washington
 K10DL-D in Tonasket, Washington
 K10DM-D in Riverside, Washington
 K10FC-D in Dodson, Montana
 K10FQ-D in Big Laramie, etc., Wyoming
 K10GF-D in Miles City, Montana
 K10GT-D in Mina/Luning, Nevada
 K10HL-D in Virginia City, Montana
 K10HO-D in Big Piney, etc., Wyoming
 K10IX-D in Newberry Springs, California, on virtual channel 2, which rebroadcasts KCBS-TV
 K10JK-D in Hinsdale, Montana
 K10JW-D in Verdigre, Nebraska
 K10KG-D in Tenakee Springs, Alaska
 K10KH-D in Shageluk, Alaska
 K10KM-D in Cape Girardeau, Missouri
 K10KR-D in Coolin, Idaho
 K10LG-D in Dryden, Washington
 K10LH-D in West Glacier, etc., Montana
 K10LJ-D in Galena, Alaska
 K10LM-D in Laketown, etc., Utah, on virtual channel 4, which rebroadcasts KTVX
 K10LQ-D in Manhattan, Nevada
 K10LU-D in Nightmute, Alaska
 K10MA-D in Waunita Hot Springs, Colorado, on virtual channel 9
 K10MG-D in Socorro, New Mexico
 K10MZ-D in Dolores, Colorado
 K10NC-D in Kenai, etc., Alaska
 K10NF-D in Halfway, Oregon
 K10NY-D in Ismay Canyon, Colorado
 K10OD-D in Weber Canyon, Colorado
 K10OG-D in Lompoc, California
 K10PM-D in Breckenridge, Colorado, on virtual channel 10
 K10PN-D in Cedar City, etc., Utah, on virtual channel 13, which rebroadcasts KSTU
 K10PR-D in Thomasville, Colorado
 K10PS-D in Pine Ridge, South Dakota
 K10PV-D in Santa Barbara, California
 K10PW-D in Gallup, New Mexico
 K10QH-D in Trout Creek, etc., Montana
 K10QJ-D in Mink Creek, Idaho, on virtual channel 8, which rebroadcasts KIFI-TV
 K10QL-D in Abilene, Texas
 K10QR-D in Leamington, Utah
 K10QX-D in Reno, Nevada
 K10QY-D in Silver City, New Mexico
 K10QZ-D in Rosebud, etc., Montana
 K10RA-D in Coulee City, Washington
 K10RB-D in Mesa, Colorado
 K10RC-D in Denton, Montana
 K10RF-D in Long Valley Junction, Utah
 K10RI-D in Marysvale, Utah
 K10RJ-D in Woodland & Kamas, Utah
 K10RL-D in East Price, Utah, on virtual channel 7, which rebroadcasts KUED
 K10RN-D in Helper, Utah
 K10RO-D in Roosevelt, etc., Utah, on virtual channel 7, which rebroadcasts KUED
 K10RP-D in Santa Clara, Utah, on virtual channel 2, which rebroadcasts KUTV
 K10RV-D in Centerville, Washington
 K10RW-D in Lake Havasu, Arizona
 K15FF-D in Salina & Redmond, Utah
 K42AD-D in Blanding/Monticello, Utah, on virtual channel 5, which rebroadcasts KSL-TV
 K47BD-D in Rural Juab County, Utah
 KAKE in Wichita, Kansas
 KBIM-TV in Roswell, New Mexico
 KBRR in Thief River Falls, Minnesota
 KBSL-DT in Goodland, Kansas
 KCHF in Santa Fe, New Mexico
 KENV-DT in Elko, Nevada
 KERO-TV in Bakersfield, California
 KETZ in El Dorado, Arkansas
 KFDA-TV in Amarillo, Texas
 KFNE in Riverton, Wyoming
 KGBY-LD in Palm Springs, California
 KGTV in San Diego, California, on virtual channel 10
 KHDT-LD in Denver, Colorado, on virtual channel 26
 KHLM-LD in Houston, Texas, on virtual channel 12
 KHPK-LD in De Soto, Texas, on virtual channel 28
 KIIO-LD in Los Angeles, California, on virtual channel 10
 KLFY-TV in Lafayette, Louisiana
 KMCA-LD in Redding, California
 KMEB in Wailuku, Hawaii
 KMOT in Minot, North Dakota
 KNIN-TV in Caldwell, Idaho
 KOLN in Lincoln, Nebraska
 KOLR in Springfield, Missouri
 KOPB-TV in Portland, Oregon, on virtual channel 10
 KQME in Lead, South Dakota
 KRDJ-LD in Lubbock, Texas
 KRMZ in Steamboat Springs, Colorado, on virtual channel 24
 KRVD-LD in Banning, California
 KSAA-LD in San Antonio, Texas
 KSAZ-TV in Phoenix, Arizona, on virtual channel 10
 KTOO-TV in Juneau, Alaska
 KTSD-TV in Pierre, South Dakota
 KTTC in Rochester, Minnesota
 KTUL in Tulsa, Oklahoma
 KTUU-TV in Anchorage, Alaska
 KTVL in Medford, Oregon
 KTVQ in Billings, Montana
 KUVM-LD in Houston, Texas, uses KHLM-LD's spectrum, on virtual channel 10
 KWCM-TV in Appleton, Minnesota, on virtual channel 10
 KWHS-LD in Colorado Springs, Colorado
 KWSU-TV in Pullman, Washington
 KWTX-TV in Waco, Texas
 KXNU-LD in Laredo, Texas
 KXTV in Sacramento, California, on virtual channel 10
 KZSW-LD in Riverside, California, on virtual channel 10
 KZTV in Corpus Christi, Texas
 W10AD-D in Montreat, North Carolina, on virtual channel 7, which rebroadcasts WSPA-TV
 W10AJ-D in Greenville, South Carolina, on virtual channel 7, which rebroadcasts WSPA-TV
 W10AK-D in Spruce Pine, North Carolina, on virtual channel 4, which rebroadcasts WYFF
 W10AL-D in Cherokee, etc., North Carolina
 W10BG-D in Mayaguez, Puerto Rico, on virtual channel 5, which rebroadcasts W05CY-D
 W10CP-D in Towanda, Pennsylvania
 W10DD-D in San Juan, Puerto Rico, on virtual channel 44
 W10DF-D in Canton, etc., North Carolina
 WALB in Albany, Georgia
 WAOE in Peoria, Illinois
 WBIQ in Birmingham, Alabama
 WBIR-TV in Knoxville, Tennessee
 WBUP in Ishpeming, Michigan
 WCBB in Augusta, Maine
 WCTI-TV in New Bern, North Carolina
 WCTX in New Haven, Connecticut, uses WTNH's spectrum, on virtual channel 59
 WDIO-DT in Duluth, Minnesota
 WDIQ in Dozier, Alabama
 WFSF-LD in Key West, Florida, on virtual channel 10
 WGEM-TV in Quincy, Illinois
 WGOM-LD in Panama City, Florida
 WHEC-TV in Rochester, New York
 WHTM-TV in Harrisburg, Pennsylvania
 WILX-TV in Onondaga, Michigan
 WIRP-LD in Raleigh, North Carolina, on virtual channel 27
 WIS in Columbia, South Carolina
 WJXX in Orange Park, Florida
 WLYH in Red Lion, Pennsylvania, uses WHTM-TV's spectrum
 WMED-TV in Calais, Maine
 WMEM-TV in Presque Isle, Maine
 WMFP in Foxborough, Massachusetts, uses WWDP's spectrum, on virtual channel 62
 WMVS (DRT) in Milwaukee, Wisconsin, on virtual channel 10
 WNXY-LD in New York, New York, on virtual channel 43
 WOIO in Shaker Heights, Ohio, on virtual channel 19
 WOWK-TV in Huntington, West Virginia
 WPLG in Miami, Florida, on virtual channel 10
 WSJT-LD in Atlantic City, New Jersey, on virtual channel 15
 WSMV-TV in Nashville, Tennessee, on virtual channel 4
 WTHI-TV in Terre Haute, Indiana
 WTNH in New Haven, Connecticut, on virtual channel 8
 WTSP in St. Petersburg, Florida, on virtual channel 10
 WTTD-LD in Hampton, Virginia
 WUAB in Lorain, Ohio, uses WOIO's spectrum, on virtual channel 43
 WVER in Rutland, Vermont
 WVFX in Clarksburg, West Virginia
 WWBT in Richmond, Virginia
 WWCI-CD in Vero Beach, Florida
 WWDP in Norwell, Massachusetts, on virtual channel 46
 WWUP-TV in Sault Ste. Marie, Michigan
 WXIA-TV in Atlanta, Georgia, on virtual channel 11
 WYGN-LD in Berrien Springs, Michigan

The following television stations, which are no longer licensed, formerly broadcast on digital channel 10 in the United States:
 K10AF-D in Troy, Montana
 K10BB-D in Ardenvoir, Washington
 K10KB-D in Austin, Nevada
 K10LD-D in Dillingham, Alaska
 K10PL-D in Victoria, Texas
 K10RM-D in Kingman, Arizona
 KBNB-LD in San Antonio, Texas
 KNEE-LD in Malaga, etc., Washington
 WVTA in Windsor, Vermont
 WXFL-LD in Florence, etc., Alabama

References

10 digital